Itaocara is a municipality located in the Brazilian state of Rio de Janeiro. Its population is 23,222 (2020) and its area is 428 km².

References

Municipalities in Rio de Janeiro (state)